Elzéar-Alexandre Taschereau (February 17, 1820 – April 12, 1898) was a Canadian Cardinal of the Roman Catholic Church. He served as Archbishop of Quebec from 1871 until his death in 1898. The first Canadian cardinal, he was elevated to the College of Cardinals by Pope Leo XIII in 1886.

Biography
One of seven children, Elzéar-Alexandre Taschereau was born in Sainte-Marie-de-la-Beauce, Quebec, to Jean-Thomas Taschereau and Marie Panet. His father was a judge of the Court of King's Bench of Quebec, and his mother was the daughter of Jean-Antoine Panet, the first Speaker of the Legislative Assembly of Lower Canada. His older brother, Jean-Thomas, was later a Puisne Justice of the Supreme Court. His great-uncle was Bernard-Claude Panet, who also served as Archbishop of Quebec (1825–1833).

Taschereau studied at the Seminary of Quebec from 1828 to 1836, and then traveled for a year to Great Britain, the Low Countries, France, and Italy. While in Rome, he received the tonsure on May 20, 1837, and his friendship with Dom Prosper Guéranger, O.S.B., led him to seriously consider joining the Benedictines. Instead he continued his studies and was ordained a priest for the Archdiocese of Quebec on 10 September 1842.

As a young priest, Taschereau was involved in providing care to the Irish immigrants to Quebec fleeing the Great Famine.  Due to the terrible conditions on the ships bringing the immigrants, typhus was rampant. Taschereau described one ship, the Agnes, as "the most plague-ridden ship of all and in danger of losing everyone on board."  In the end, the Agnes had a death rate of forty per cent.

Taschereau obtained a doctorate in Canon law in Rome in 1856 and had a dual career in teaching and pastoral care. He served as a teacher, director, prefect of studies and Superior at the Seminary where he himself had studied for ordination. He helped found the Université Laval in 1852 and served as its second Rector (1860–66, 1869–71). He remained on the staff of the Seminary until his consecration as the Archbishop of Quebec on 19 March 1871.

At the urging of the Canadian government and many of the faithful, in 1886 Pope Leo XIII made Taschereau Cardinal-Priest of Santa Maria della Vittoria, Rome, the first from Canada. He was not able to stay in his post as archbishop for long, however, as illness forced him to turn over his workload to Mgr. Louis-Nazaire Bégin, who was named as his Coadjutor Archbishop in 1892. Cardinal Taschereau died in Quebec City on April 12, 1898.

References

External links

 
 Biography at the Dictionary of Canadian Biography Online
 The Cardinals of the Holy Roman Church, by Salvador Miranda at Florida International University
 Biography at the Catholic Encyclopedia
 The Canadian Encyclopedia: Taschereau, Elzéar-Alexandre
 Assemblée Nationale Quebec: Thomas-Pierre-Joseph Taschereau (in French)

1820 births
1898 deaths
Roman Catholic archbishops of Quebec
Canadian cardinals
Cardinals created by Pope Leo XIII
Rectors of Université Laval
People from Beauce, Quebec
Elzear-Alexander
19th-century Roman Catholic archbishops in Canada
Burials at the Cathedral-Basilica of Notre-Dame de Québec